The 1991–92 San Jose Sharks season was the Sharks' inaugural season. They finished in sixth place in the Smythe Division with a record of 17 wins, 58 losses, and 5 ties for 39 points. Goaltender Jeff Hackett was named team MVP.

The last remaining active member of the 1991–92 San Jose Sharks was Ray Whitney, who retired after the 2013–14 season. He was also the last remaining active player to commence his NHL career as a member of the expansion San Jose Sharks.

Offseason

Connection to Minnesota
The Gund family had been partners in the Oakland Seals franchise which was moved to Cleveland to become the NHL Cleveland Barons. This franchise was merged with the North Stars franchise and the Gunds became partners in the North Stars' franchise. The Gund family had long wanted to bring hockey back to the Bay Area, and asked the NHL for permission to move the North Stars there in the late 1980s, but were vetoed by the league. Meanwhile, a group led by former Hartford Whalers owner Howard Baldwin was pushing the NHL to bring a team to San Jose, where a new arena was being built. Eventually a compromise was struck by the league, where the Gunds would sell their share of the North Stars to Baldwin's group, with the Gunds receiving an expansion team in the Bay Area to begin play in the 1991–92 NHL season. In return, the North Stars would be allowed to participate as an equal partner in an expansion draft with the new Bay Area team. Neither team retains the history of the Seals/Barons franchise.

On May 5, 1990, the Gunds officially sold their share of the North Stars to Baldwin and were awarded a new team in the Bay Area, based in San Jose. Over 5000 potential names were submitted by mail for the new team. While the first-place finisher was "Blades", the Gunds were concerned about the name's negative connotations (weapons, etc.) and went with the runner-up, "Sharks". The name was said to have been inspired by the large number of sharks living in the Pacific Ocean. Seven different varieties live there, and one area of water near the Bay Area is known as the "red triangle" because of its shark population. The team's first marketing head, Matt Levine, said of the new name, "Sharks are relentless, determined, swift, agile, bright and fearless. We plan to build an organization that has all those qualities."

Drafting
On top of the normal expansion process, the Sharks participated in a draft to select players from the North Stars. The Sharks and Stars then participated in an expansion draft. Both teams selected in the NHL Entry Draft. The Sharks selected second-overall in the first round, and then first-overall in the following rounds. The Sharks selected Pat Falloon with their first pick, regarded widely as a draft bust.

Captain
Defenseman Doug Wilson was acquired from the Chicago Blackhawks. He was named the franchise's first team captain.

Regular season
The Sharks played their first ever game on October 4, 1991, against the Vancouver Canucks at Pacific Coliseum in Vancouver, British Columbia, losing 4–3 to the Canucks. Craig Coxe scored the first goal in team history. The next night, on October 5, the Sharks played their first ever home game at the Cow Palace, losing 5–2 to Vancouver.  The club earned their first victory during their third game, on October 8, as Kelly Kisio scored the game-winning goal at 16:45 of the third period, leading the Sharks to a 4–3 win over the Calgary Flames. Goaltender Brian Hayward made 36 saves to earn the victory.

After recording their first win, the Sharks lost their next 13 games, falling to 1–15–0, before putting together back-to-back wins over the Edmonton Oilers and New York Islanders.  The team earned their first ever tie against the Detroit Red Wings on November 14, as the teams skated to a 3–3 score.  On November 29, after losing their first 13 road games, the Sharks earned their first ever point on the road, as San Jose tied the Edmonton Oilers, 4–4, at Northlands Coliseum in Edmonton, Alberta. The next night, on November 30, the Sharks held off the Calgary Flames for a 2–1 victory at the Saddledome in Calgary, Alberta, earning their first ever road victory.

Throughout the season, the Sharks allowed 10 or more goals in a game three times, which included a club-record 11 goals allowed against the Detroit Red Wings on February 15, 1992, as Detroit defeated the Sharks, 11–1. The team did not earn any shutouts during the season.  The most goals San Jose scored in a game was on February 26, as the Sharks defeated the Quebec Nordiques, 7–4. The team was shut out nine times, the first one being on October 23, losing 3–0 to the Hartford Whalers.

Overall, San Jose finished the season with a 17–58–5 record, earning 39 points, and sixth place in the Smythe Division, 35 points behind the fifth-place Calgary Flames, and 42 points behind the Winnipeg Jets for the final playoff position in the division.

Rookie Pat Falloon led the club with 25 goals, 34 assists and 59 points in 79 games. David Bruce was the only other Shark to score 20 or more goals, as he had 22 goals and 38 points in 60 games. Brian Mullen scored 18 goals and 46 points in 72 games. On defence, Doug Wilson had nine goals and 28 points in an injury-shortened 44 games to lead the blueline. Link Gaetz provided the team toughness, earning 326 penalty minutes in only 48 games, while chipping in with six goals and 12 points.

In goal, Jeff Hackett earned the most playing time, going 11–27–1 with a 3.82 GAA and .892 save percentage in 42 games.

The Sharks finished the season 22nd in both scoring (219 goals for) and goaltending (359 goals against).

Season standings

Schedule and results

Player statistics

Forwards
Note: GP= Games played; G= Goals; AST= Assists; PTS = Points; PIM = Points

Defensemen
Note: GP= Games played; G= Goals; AST= Assists; PTS = Points; PIM = Points

Goaltending
Note: GP= Games played; W= Wins; L= Losses; T = Ties; SO = Shutouts; GAA = Goals Against

Transactions

Trades

Free agency

Draft picks

NHL Entry Draft

NHL Supplemental Draft

Dispersal Draft Results

The Sharks selected 24 players from the North Stars.

Expansion Draft Results

References
 2021–22 San Jose Sharks Media Guide
 Sharks on Hockey Database
 The Internet Hockey Database

San Jose Sharks seasons
San Jose Sharks season, 1991-92
San Jose
San Jose Sharks
San Jose Sharks